Donald C. Bolduc (born May 8, 1962) is an American politician and retired United States Army brigadier general. The Republican nominee in the 2022 United States Senate election in New Hampshire, he lost to incumbent Democrat Maggie Hassan. Bolduc was also a Republican candidate for the U.S. Senate in 2020 but failed to win the primary. 

He has been described by newspapers and wire services as a far-right politician. For more than a year, Bolduc endorsed the false Stop the Steal conspiracy theory positing that the 2020 U.S. presidential election was rigged to favor Joe Biden. Two days after winning his 2022 primary, he changed his stance and acknowledged that Biden is the legitimate president and that the election was not stolen, though he continued to promote the false claim that the election was marred by fraud. The following month, he changed his position again, saying, "I can't say that it was stolen or not. I don't have enough information."

Early life and education
Bolduc was born in Laconia, New Hampshire, on May 8, 1962, to Armand A. Bolduc (1939–2018) and Janet Gagne Bolduc (1940–2003). His father was a farmer and served in the National Guard. Bolduc earned a Bachelor of Arts degree from Salem State University in 1989 and a Master of Science in security technologies from the United States Army War College.

U.S. Army service
Bolduc served ten tours in Afghanistan, during which he received two Purple Hearts. In 2006, he led the 1st Battalion, 3rd Special Forces Group during Operation Medusa. From 2010 to 2011, he served as Combined Joint Special Operations Task Force commander. From 2012 to 2013, he commanded the Combined Joint Special Operations Component, where he started the "Village Stability Operations" program. Bolduc suffered a hip injury in a friendly fire incident in 2001. In 2005, it was discovered that Bolduc also had a traumatic brain injury (TBI) and post-traumatic stress disorder (PTSD).

U.S. Senate campaigns
In June 2019, Bolduc entered the 2020 United States Senate election in New Hampshire, seeking the Republican nomination to run against incumbent Democratic senator Jeanne Shaheen. He lost the Republican primary to Trump-endorsed Corky Messner. During the election campaign, Bolduc ran a television ad attacking Democrats as "a bunch of liberal, socialist pansies": a remark perceived as being homophobic.

After the 2020 election, Bolduc closely tied himself to Trump; in February 2021, announced that he would run for Senate again in the 2022 election, hoping to challenge Democratic incumbent Senator Maggie Hassan. In the Republican primary, he ran against Chuck Morse, the New Hampshire State Senate president. Bolduc sought the endorsement of Donald Trump, who praised Bolduc as a "strong guy, tough guy" but did not make any endorsement in the primary. On September 14, Bolduc won the Republican primary election, defeating Morse.

Political positions 
Bolduc was described as far-right during his 2022 Senate run as a Republican candidate.

Bolduc has called for the repeal of the Seventeenth Amendment to the U.S. Constitution, ending direct popular election of U.S. senators. He opposed the provision in the Democrats' Inflation Reduction Act allowing  Medicare to negotiate lower prices for prescription drugs, saying, "Anything the government’s involved in, it's not good, it doesn't work."

Abortion and fertility medicine
Bolduc opposes legal abortion and hailed the Supreme Court decision overturning Roe v. Wade, calling it an occasion to "rejoice". After winning the Republican primary election, Bolduc distanced himself from a 15-week federal abortion ban proposed by Republican Senator Lindsey Graham; Bolduc said abortion should be a "state-level" issue. Bolduc also considers the disposal of embryos for in vitro fertilization "a pretty disgusting practice".

January 6 insurrection
Following the January 6, 2021, assault on the U.S. Capitol in the final weeks of Trump's presidency, General Mark Milley, chairman of the Joint Chiefs of Staff, reportedly telephoned his Chinese counterpart to assure him of the strategic stability of the United States. In a September 2021 appearance on Fox & Friends, Bolduc criticized Milley, saying, "I believe his actions are irresponsible and they fall somewhere between treason and dereliction of duty."

Foreign policy 
In a February 2021 op-ed in USA Today, Bolduc criticized the Afghanistan Study Group recommendation urging a reversal on the scheduled withdrawal of U.S. military forces from Afghanistan. Bolduc urged the Biden administration to stick with the withdrawal deadline as set by the Trump administration.

Promotion of conspiracy theories and falsehoods

2020 presidential election
Bolduc is a 2020 presidential election denier. He endorsed the false claim, promoted by outgoing president Donald Trump, that the 2020 presidential election was rigged to favor Joe Biden. In May 2021, Bolduc was one of 124 retired generals and admirals who signed an open letter promoting the lie that the presidential election was "rigged" in Biden's favor. Throughout his campaign for the Republican nomination for U.S. Senate, Bolduc continued to promote the false claim that the election was stolen and that Trump actually won; in an August 2022 primary debate, he said of his signing the May 2021 letter: "damn it, I stand by [it]". 

On September 14, 2022, two days after winning the Republican primary, Bolduc reversed himself, saying, "I have come to the conclusion, and I want to be definitive on this, the election was not stolen." Although he acknowledged Biden as the legitimate president, Bolduc continued to promote his false claims that the election was marred by fraud.

Accusations against Chris Sununu 
After Chris Sununu announced in November 2021 that he would seek reelection as governor and would not run for U.S. Senate—an announcement that was viewed as a setback for the Republicans' hopes of winning Hassan's seat—Bolduc gave a conspiracy-filled interview on conservative talk radio in which he denounced Sununu, a fellow Republican, as a "Chinese Communist sympathizer" and claimed that Sununu's business "supports terrorism". Sununu has described Bolduc as "not a serious candidate" and a "conspiracy-theorist extremist"; Sununu endorsed Bolduc's primary rival, Chuck Morse. However, Sununu endorsed Bolduc for the general election.

COVID-19 pandemic
Bolduc has repeated misinformation about COVID-19. He has falsely claimed that COVID-19 vaccines are really "Bill Gates saying we should put [micro]chips inside people" and asserted that the use of face masks to control the spread of the virus "cause[s] more problems than they solve".

Litter boxes in schools 

Speaking to an audience in North Hampton, New Hampshire, on October 27, 2022, Bolduc repeated the debunked hoax that children are being told they can identify as cats and use litter boxes in schools. Pinkerton Academy and the Dover School District released statements refuting Bolduc's claim, calling his allegations "entirely untrue".

References

External links

 Official campaign website
 

1962 births
Candidates in the 2020 United States Senate elections
Candidates in the 2022 United States Senate elections
Far-right politicians in the United States
Living people
Members of the United States Army Special Forces
Military personnel from New Hampshire
New Hampshire Republicans
People from Laconia, New Hampshire
Salem State University alumni
United States Army generals
United States Army personnel of the War in Afghanistan (2001–2021)
United States Army War College alumni